The 2008 Connecticut Huskies football team represented the University of Connecticut in the 2008 NCAA Division I FBS football season as a member of the Big East Conference.  The team was coached by Randy Edsall and played its home games at Rentschler Field in East Hartford, Connecticut.

Schedule

Game summaries

Hofstra

Making their 2008 season debut, the Huskies came out strong scoring 14 points in each of the first two quarters en route to a 35–3 victory against FCS opponent Hofstra. In the game, Donald Brown rushed for 150 yards and four touchdowns before giving way to Robbie Frey who added a score of his own. UConn also extended their home winning streak to 8 games extending back to last season.

Temple

As UConn took the show on the road, conditions were less than ideal as Hurricane Hanna (in a weakened state) made her presence felt in Philadelphia. The game which was billed by Temple as UConn/Temple II didn't really live up to the hype of the controversial game last year. In a game which was largely played within the 20s, Donald Brown rushed for a career-high 214 yards, and the game-winning touchdown in overtime. Place kicker Tony Ciaravino added two field goals to give UConn their twelve-point total for the day.

Virginia

Junior tailback Donald Brown rushed for over 200 yards for the second consecutive week and senior quarterback Tyler Lorenzen had a terrific game running the Connecticut offense as the Huskies manhandled Virginia, 45–10, in a non-conference football game played before a sellout crowd of 40,000 at Rentschler Field.

Baylor

Junior tailback Donald Brown scored on a three-yard run with 6:04 remaining in the fourth quarter and the Connecticut defense held Baylor on fourth down with less than a minute to play as the Huskies hung on to defeat the Bears, 31–28, before a crowd of 38,870 at Rentschler Field.

Louisville

The Huskies took the show on the road to start a very long, and potentially very rewarding three game road trip. The defense for UConn was less than stellar allowing 508 yards of offense, almost double their own output. The shining light for the Huskies was Donald Brown, who rushed for 190 yards and a touchdown. When he was given the ball, he made things happen time and time again. The injury bug also hit the Huskies and hit them hard. Starting quarterback Tyler Lorenzen suffered a broken foot early in the second quarter paving the way for Notre Dame transfer Zach Frazier to take over the helm. Later in the third quarter, senior tight end Steve Brouse suffered a broken fibula. Despite the injuries to two of their senior offensive leaders, the Huskies rallied late behind Frazier and two way player Darius Butler. Trailing by one point with 2:45 left in the game, Linebacker Lawrence Wilson picked off Cardinal's quarterback Hunter Cantwell and went 45 yards the other way to put UConn up 26–21, with the two-point conversion being unsuccessful. The UConn defense held strong on the ensuing possession, sealing the victory, and the Huskies second consecutive 5–0 start.

International Bowl

The Huskies had a great season and were invited to their third bowl game in school history for the second straight year.  On January 3, 2009, they played the University of Buffalo Bulls in the International Bowl in Toronto, Ontario, Canada.  The Huskies started off committing sloppy turnovers in the first half but would go on to win the game 38–20. Steve Brouse caught the only touchdown pass of the game while running back Donald Brown rushed for 261 yards on 29 carries and one touchdown. He was named the MVP of the game and after the game he decided to forgo his senior season to enter the 2009 NFL Draft.

2009 Draft
Four players on the 2008 UConn football team were selected in the 2009 NFL Draft on April 25, 2009.  Donald Brown was selected at #27 by the Indianapolis Colts, Darius Butler was selected by the New England Patriots at #41, Will Beatty and Cody Brown were selected late in the 2nd round at #60 (Will Beatty, New York Giants) and #63 (Cody Brown, Arizona Cardinals).

After the Draft, four other Huskies signed free agent contracts with NFL Teams.  Those Huskies include: Julius Williams (Jacksonville Jaguars), Dahna Deleston (Chicago Bears), Tyler Lorenzen (Jacksonville Jaguars), and Keith Gray (Carolina Panthers)

On May 2, 2009, Senior Martin Bédard was taken in the second round of the CFL Canadian Football League Draft by the Montreal Alouettes

Rankings

Team awards
The 2008 Connecticut Huskies post season team awards were handed out during their annual team banquet.  The award winners were:
Most Valuable Player
Donald Brown
Offensive Player of the Year
Donald Brown
Defensive Player of the Year
Cody Brown
Special Teams Player of the Year
Robbie Frey
Joseph M. Giannelli Unsung Hero Award
William Beatty and Dahna Deleston
John L. Toner Scholar Athlete Award
Keith Gray
Football Alumni Award
Tyler Lorenzen and Steve Brouse
Kendall Madison Award
Darius Butler
Brian Kozlowski Award
Julius Williams

Roster

References

Connecticut
UConn Huskies football seasons
International Bowl champion seasons
Connecticut Huskies football